Terneysky District is an administrative and municipal district (raion, one of the twenty-two in Primorsky Krai, Russia. It is located in the north of the krai and borders with Khabarovsk Krai in the north, the Sea of Japan in the east and southeast, the territory of Dalnegorsk Town Under Krai Jurisdiction in the southwest, and with Krasnoarmeysky and Pozharsky Districts in the west. Its administrative center is the urban locality (an urban-type settlement) of Terney. Population:  The population of Terney accounts for 28.8% of the district's total population.

Geography
Terneysky District is the largest district of the krai in terms of area and the smallest by population. Most of the district's territory is covered with forests which are the district's main riches. Most of the Sikhote-Alin Nature Reserve is located in Terneysky District.

Economy
The industry is represented by the timber processing enterprises and the fish processing factory in Svetlaya.

Tourism
There are springs of thermal radon waters in the district (Amginskoye Deposit). The Tyoply Klyuch Health Resort operates near these springs.

References

Notes

Sources

Districts of Primorsky Krai